Dhok Kasib is a village and Union Council of Mandi Bahauddin District in the Punjab province of Pakistan. Postal Code of Dhok Kasib is 50331.

Education 
Village contains the basic facilities of education. Government Higher Secondary School for Boys while Government High Model school for Girls is present in village.

See also
Dhok Nawan Lok

References

Villages in Mandi Bahauddin District
Union councils of Mandi Bahauddin District
Union councils of Punjab, Pakistan